Hugh James McKay (5 November 1883 – 28 August 1971) was an Australian rules footballer who played with Geelong in the Victorian Football League (VFL).

Notes

External links 

1883 births
1971 deaths
Australian rules footballers from Victoria (Australia)
Geelong Football Club players